Sivan koviladi is a small town in Sri Lanka. It is located within Northern Province.This Small town famous to Cultural Dances & Hindu rituals.

List of towns in Northern Province, Sri Lanka

External links
Sinthupuram (in Tamil)
Village Website

Towns in Jaffna District
Valikamam West DS Division